Zhusha is a town in the northwest of Xinyi city, Guangdong province, China, which is located in 22°33′N 110°56′E. It is merged by the original Zhusha, Ane and Wangsha three towns in 2003, with a total area of 282 square kilometers and a population of over 90 thousands. It is the biggest town in Xinyi city.

History 
Zhusha, got its name because of the Vermilion Ridge (also named Rouge Hill in ancient times). It first belonged to Liangde county during Liang, Chen, Sui dynasty, then belonged to Huaide county during Tang, five dynasties and Song dynasty, later it belonged to the middle road of Xinyi County during the last of Song and Yuan dynasty, and then named as Xinfengdu belonged to Xining county during Ming dynasty. It was renamed as Dasheng castle belonged to Xinyi County at the beginning of the Qing dynasty, and renamed as Xinyi County sixth area Zhusha village in 1932, and then renamed again as the Third victory county in 1940.

In December 1952, it was named as the Sixth district of Xinyi County, and in February 1957 named as Zhuasha county; and in the Autumn of 1958, the Zhusha People's commune was established and in June 1961, named as Zhusha district (朱砂区).

However, it was renamed as Zhusha People's commune again in January 1963, and then renamed back as Zhusha district in December 1983; and then in the winter of 1986, formed as Zhusha Town. On November 26, 2003, it is merged with  Ane(安莪） and Wangsha（旺沙）  to be the Zhusha Town now.

Administration
Administratively, Zhusha Town is under the jurisdiction of Xinyi. It is a town-level city, which consists of three parts, including Zhusha, Wangsha and Ane. It administers 32 village-level divisions.

Geography

Political geography 

Zhusha Town is located in the north of the Xinyi city, 29 km from the urban area. It is bordered by Guizi Town and Chashan Town in the east, connected to Huaixiang Town and Chidong Town in the South, next to the Jindong Town in West, and adjacent to with Cenxi city, Guangxi province in the north.

Landscape and climate 
Zhusha has a subtropical climate with the average annual temperature over 20°C and the average annual precipitation about 1800 mm. The landscape of Zhusha Town is mainly hills. It has rich mineral resources, including kaolin, granite, Mica, gold, silver, copper, iron, manganese, limestone and so on. The land area of the whole town is about 119 850 acres, of which 41522 acres are arable.

Transportation 
China National Highway 207
G65 Baotou–Maoming Expressway
Luoyang–Zhanjiang Railway

Economy 
In 2010, the industrial output of the whole town was more than 2 billion RMB. There were 2,158 self-employment industrial, 62 legal entities registered companies in the whole town. On the other hand, Zhusha Town is rich in mineral resources and water resources, including 19 hydroelectric stations at present, the total generating capacity over 50 million degrees in 2010. Its industrial type are mainly ethylene follow-up processing, ceramics and weaving and the agriculture are mainly rice, corn, cinnamon and plums.

Education 
There are one middle school, 15 elementary schools, 5 kindergartens in Zhusha Town.

Culture 

Shigen Mountain (石根山) is the most famous mountain in Zhusha Town with the height of 990 meters above sea level. It is the border along Guangdong and Guangxi province. The whole Zhusha town can be seen on the top of Shigen Mountain. There is concrete plank road built on the cliffs of the mid-levels.

Lotus Temple (莲花祠) is located in the Liantang village of Zhusha Town with an area of 339.2 square meters. The temple was built with wood on a circular mound in Kangxi 61 years (1722) and got its name because it looks like a lotus flower. It is full of various murals, reliefs, wood carvings and there is a pond in front of the temple.

References

External links
  

Towns in Guangdong
Xinyi, Guangdong